The 1999 Washington Huskies football team represented the University of Washington in the 1999 NCAA Division I-A football season. Led by first-year head coach Rick Neuheisel, they played their home games at Husky Stadium. The Huskies finished the regular season at 7–4, tied for second (6–2) in the Pac-10 Conference.

At the Holiday Bowl in San Diego, Washington lost 20–24 to #7 Kansas State of the Big 12 Conference.

Schedule

Game summaries

Washington State

Source: USA Today

Roster

NFL Draft
Two Huskies were selected in the 2000 NFL Draft, which lasted seven rounds (254 selections).

References

Washington
Washington Huskies football seasons
Washington Huskies football